The MOS Technology 6509, an enhanced version of the popular 6502 microprocessor, is capable of addressing up to 1 megabyte of RAM via bank switching. While numerous 6502-based processors can perform bank switching, they achieve this via separate logic. The 6509 has this logic on-chip.

The 6509 has a reputation for being difficult to program, due to its bank switching scheme. It is used in the Commodore CBM-II line of computers.

References

Further reading

External links
MOS 6509 datasheet (GIF format, zipped)
MOS 6509 datasheet (PDF format)

65xx microprocessors
MOS Technology microprocessors
8-bit microprocessors